The Electoral district of New Norfolk was a single-member electoral district of the Tasmanian House of Assembly. Its population centre was the town of New Norfolk, northwest of the Tasmanian capital, Hobart.

The seat was created ahead of the Assembly's first election held in 1856, and was abolished when the Tasmanian parliament adopted the Hare-Clark electoral model in 1909.

Members for New Norfolk

References
 
 
 Parliament of Tasmania (2006). The Parliament of Tasmania from 1956

Former electoral districts of Tasmania
1856 establishments in Australia
1909 disestablishments in Australia